Robert Alan Flower (5 August 1955 – 2 October 2014) was an Australian rules footballer with Melbourne Football Club. His first game was against Geelong in 1973 and he captained the team from 1981 until his final game in 1987. He held the record for the number of games for his club, 272, until overtaken by David Neitz in 2006.

Football career
In a radio interview in July 2006 conducted by the Coodabeen Champions, Flower stated that the club secretary Jim Cardwell rang to offer him the number 2 guernsey before his first senior game, an unofficial statement that the club saw great potential in the seventeen-year-old.

Known as "Tulip", he was a wingman for most of his career and was characterised by his ability to create space for himself and kick and handpass the ball with extraordinary accuracy. He possessed speed, sure-footedness and unrivalled tactical awareness.

In the documentary Red & Blue: The History of the Melbourne Football Club (1939–2005), Ian Ridley said of Flower, "Taking into account poise, ability, skill and marking, kicking, handballing...it doesn't matter what you refer to, but Robert Flower is the greatest footballer that I have seen in my life."

In Ken Piesse's The Complete Guide to Australian Football, Flower's player summary quotes Brent Crosswell: "...beat Flower and you could just about retire from League Football because anything else smacked of anti-climax." Wayne Schimmelbusch in the same publication said: "I paid more attention to Robert Flower than any other opponent."

Jim Main and Russell Holmesby mention Flower's thin physique and low playing weight—68 kilograms. It was assumed early in his career that he could not succeed because of his "wiry" frame. He sustained injuries that kept him from appearing in another 52 games, but he still played 272 out of a possible 324 games, and he was never omitted from the senior side when available.

Final season
Towards the end of the 1986 season, as Flower completed his 14th season without playing in a final, the Melbourne Football Club placed newspaper advertisements requesting donations from the public to enable the club to recruit a high-profile player under the headline "Please give Robbie one last chance to play in a final". Despite raising less money than expected, Melbourne did reach the 1987 finals after a dramatic final round.

His final three games were the only time Flower played in the finals. His last game was against Hawthorn in the preliminary final. Although Melbourne had led for the entire match, a free kick and a 15-metre penalty infamously awarded after the final siren—via a Jim Stynes infraction—saw Hawthorn's Gary Buckenara kick the winning goal. Flower recalls in his autobiography Robbie that he started to run from the ground and paused to see the ball go through the goal and then went to the dressing rooms where he threw a can of drink against the wall in anger. Flower was injured in the game, and his ability to play in the Grand Final, had Melbourne won, was not certain.

Playing statistics

|- style="background-color: #EAEAEA"
! scope="row" style="text-align:center" | 1973
|style="text-align:center;"|
| 2 || 13 || 4 || 7 || 181 || 43 || 224 || 63 ||  || 0.3 || 0.5 || 13.9 || 3.3 || 17.2 || 4.8 || 
|-
! scope="row" style="text-align:center" | 1974
|style="text-align:center;"|
| 2 || 18 || 22 || 14 || 196 || 68 || 264 || 67 ||  || 1.2 || 0.8 || 10.9 || 3.8 || 14.7 || 3.7 || 
|- style="background:#eaeaea;"
! scope="row" style="text-align:center" | 1975
|style="text-align:center;"|
| 2 || 20 || 14 || 14 || 277 || 58 || 335 || 77 ||  || 0.7 || 0.8 || 14.6 || 3.1 || 17.6 || 4.1 || 
|-
! scope="row" style="text-align:center" | 1976
|style="text-align:center;"|
| 2 || 19 || 17 || 19 || 248 || 123 || 371 || 103 ||  || 0.9 || 1.0 || 13.1 || 6.5 || 19.5 || 5.4 || 
|- style="background:#eaeaea;"
! scope="row" style="text-align:center" | 1977
|style="text-align:center;"|
| 2 || 20 || 23 || 11 || 254 || 141 || 395 || 98 ||  || 1.2 || 0.6 || 12.7 || 7.1 || 19.8 || 4.9 || 
|-
! scope="row" style="text-align:center" | 1978
|style="text-align:center;"|
| 2 || 22 || 18 || 21 || 304 || 113 || 417 || 114 ||  || 0.8 || 1.0 || 13.8 || 5.1 || 19.0 || 5.2 || 
|- style="background:#eaeaea;"
! scope="row" style="text-align:center" | 1979
|style="text-align:center;"|
| 2 || 21 || 33 || 29 || 285 || 196 || 481 || 103 ||  || 1.6 || 1.4 || 13.6 || 9.3 || 22.9 || 4.9 || 
|-
! scope="row" style="text-align:center" | 1980
|style="text-align:center;"|
| 2 || 22 || 21 || 26 || 275 || 217 || 492 || 127 ||  || 1.0 || 1.2 || 12.5 || 9.9 || 22.4 || 5.8 || 
|- style="background:#eaeaea;"
! scope="row" style="text-align:center" | 1981
|style="text-align:center;"|
| 2 || 16 || 5 || 3 || 182 || 124 || 306 || 68 ||  || 0.3 || 0.2 || 11.4 || 7.8 || 19.1 || 4.3 || 
|-
! scope="row" style="text-align:center" | 1982
|style="text-align:center;"|
| 2 || 21 || 25 || 26 || 264 || 188 || 452 || 117 ||  || 1.2 || 1.2 || 12.6 || 9.0 || 21.5 || 5.6 || 
|- style="background:#eaeaea;"
! scope="row" style="text-align:center" | 1983
|style="text-align:center;"|
| 2 || 20 || 40 || 24 || 267 || 147 || 414 || 116 ||  || 2.0 || 1.2 || 13.4 || 7.4 || 20.7 || 5.8 || 
|-
! scope="row" style="text-align:center" | 1984
|style="text-align:center;"|
| 2 || 21 || 28 || 18 || 229 || 162 || 391 || 102 ||  || 1.3 || 0.9 || 10.9 || 7.7 || 18.6 || 4.9 || 
|- style="background:#eaeaea;"
! scope="row" style="text-align:center" | 1985
|style="text-align:center;"|
| 2 || 3 || 3 || 2 || 30 || 17 || 47 || 11 ||  || 1.0 || 0.7 || 10.0 || 5.7 || 15.7 || 3.7 || 
|-
! scope="row" style="text-align:center" | 1986
|style="text-align:center;"|
| 2 || 16 || 15 || 11 || 152 || 78 || 230 || 64 ||  || 0.9 || 0.7 || 9.5 || 4.9 || 14.4 || 4.0 || 
|- style="background:#eaeaea;"
! scope="row" style="text-align:center" | 1987
|style="text-align:center;"|
| 2 || 20 || 47 || 31 || 215 || 60 || 275 || 91 || 25 || 2.4 || 1.6 || 10.8 || 3.0 || 13.8 || 4.6 || 1.3
|- class="sortbottom"
! colspan=3| Career
! 272
! 315
! 256
! 3359
! 1735
! 5094
! 1321
! 25
! 1.2
! 1.0
! 12.4
! 6.4
! 18.8
! 4.9
! 1.3
|}

Post-football career
After retiring as a player, Flower was inducted in the Australian Football Hall of Fame in 1996 and was named on the wing in Melbourne's Team of the Century. He later served on the Melbourne board until he resigned after being diagnosed with cardiomyopathy in 2004. He had subsequently been diagnosed with prostate cancer in 2001.

Personal life
His younger brother Tom Flower played 26 games for Melbourne over three seasons in the late 1970s. Robert's son, Brad, was considered a possible father–son selection in 2003 after playing for Sandringham Football Club, but he was overlooked and was never recruited to an AFL team.

Flower died on 2 October 2014 after a brief illness.

Books
 Robbie by Robert Flower with Ron Reed (1987). Caribou Publications.
 Ken Piesse The Complete Guide to Australian Football   Pan Macmillan Australia (1995) .
 Main, J. & Holmesby, R. Encyclopedia of AFL Football Players AFL Publishing (2005) .

References

External links

DemonWiki profile
Robbie Flower at the Western Oval

1955 births
2014 deaths
Melbourne Football Club players
Australian Football Hall of Fame inductees
Victorian State of Origin players
All-Australians (1953–1988)
Melbourne Football Club captains
Australian rules footballers from Melbourne
Australia international rules football team players